Stanislaus Pascal Franchot Tone (February 27, 1905 – September 18, 1968) was an American actor, producer, and director of stage, film and television. He was a leading man in the 1930s and early 1940s, and at the height of his career was known for his gentlemanly sophisticate roles, with supporting roles by the 1950s. His acting crossed many genres including pre-Code romantic leads to noir layered roles and World War I films. He appeared as a guest star in episodes of several golden age television series, including The Twilight Zone and The Alfred Hitchcock Hour while continuing to act and produce in the theater and movies throughout the 1960s.

Tone was nominated for an Academy Award for Best Actor for his role as Midshipman Roger Byam in Mutiny on the Bounty (1935), along with his co-stars Clark Gable and Charles Laughton, making it the only film to have three simultaneous Best Actor nominations, and leading to the creation of the Best Supporting Actor category.

Early life and education 
Stanislaus Pascal Franchot Tone was born in Niagara Falls, New York, the youngest son of Dr. Frank Jerome Tone, the wealthy president of the Carborundum Company, and his socially prominent wife, Gertrude Van Vrancken Franchot. Tone was also a distant relative of Wolfe Tone (the "father of Irish Republicanism"). Tone was of French Canadian, Irish, and English ancestry. Through his ancestor, the nobleman Gilbert L'Homme de Basque, translated to Basque Homme and finally Bascom, he was of French Basque descent.

Tone was educated at The Hill School in Pottstown, Pennsylvania, from which he was dismissed "for being a subtle influence for disorder throughout the fall term". He then entered Cornell University, where he was president of the drama club, acting in productions of Shakespeare.  He was also elected to the Sphinx Head Society and joined the Alpha Delta Phi fraternity. After graduating in 1927, he gave up the family business to pursue an acting career in the theater and he moved to Greenwich Village, New York.

Career

1927–1932: Broadway 

Tone was in The Belt (1927), Centuries (1927–28), The International (1928), and a popular adaptation of The Age of Innocence (1928–29) with Katherine Cornell. He followed it with appearances in Uncle Vanya (1929), Cross Roads (1929), Red Rust (1929–30), Hotel Universe (1930), and Pagan Lady (1930–31).

He joined the Theatre Guild and played Curly in their production of Green Grow the Lilacs (1931), where Tone sang, which later became the basis for the musical Oklahoma! Robert Benchley of The New Yorker said that "Tone made lyrical love to [co-star] Walker" between the Sammy Lee chorus routines of the play. The Lynn Riggs play received mixed reviews, mostly favorable, and was a popular success lasting 64 performances on Broadway in addition to its road tour.

Tone was also a founding member of the Group Theatre, when the Theater Guild disbanded, along with other former guild members Harold Clurman, Cheryl Crawford, Lee Strasberg, Stella Adler, and Clifford Odets. Clifford Odets recalled of Tone's acting, "The two most talented young actors I have known in the American theater in my time have been Franchot Tone and Marlon Brando, and I think Franchot was the more talented." Strasberg, who was a director in the Group during 1931–1941 and then teacher of "The Method" in the 1950s, had been a castmate of Tone's in Green Grow the Lilacs.

These were intense and productive years for him; among the productions of the Group he acted in were 1931 (1931) lasting 12 performances, Maxwell Anderson's Night Over Taos (1932) a play in verse that lasted 10, The House of Connelly (1931) lasting 91 performances and John Howard Lawson's Success Story (1932) directed by Lee Strasberg. Outside of Group productions, he was in A Thousand Summers (1932).

Tone made his film debut with The Wiser Sex (1932) starring Claudette Colbert, filmed by Paramount at their Astoria Studios.

1933–1939: The MGM years 
Tone was the first of the Group to go to Hollywood when MGM offered him a film contract. In his memoir on the Group Theater, The Fervent Years, Harold Clurman recalls Tone being the most confrontational and egocentric of the group in the beginning. Burgess Meredith credits Tone with informing him of the existence of "the Method" and what was soon to be the Actors' Studio under Strasberg's teachings. Tone himself considered cinema far more invasive to private life and paced differently than theater productions. He recalled his stage years with fondness, financially supporting the Group Theater in its declining years.

MGM immediately gave Tone a series of impressive roles, casting him in six pre-Code film standards. Starting in 1933 with a support role in the romantic WWI drama Today We Live, written by William Faulkner in collaboration with director Howard Hawks. The script was first conceived as a WWI buddy film, but the studio executives wanted a vehicle for their popular leading lady Joan Crawford, forcing Faulkner and Hawks to work in the romance between co-stars Gary Cooper and Crawford. Tone was then the romantic male lead in Gabriel Over the White House starring Walter Huston, followed by a lead role with Loretta Young in Midnight Mary.

Tone romanced Miriam Hopkins in King Vidor's The Stranger's Return and was the male lead in Stage Mother. He also had a role in Bombshell, with Jean Harlow and Lee Tracy. The last of the sequence of films was Dancing Lady, with an on-screen love triangle with his future wife Joan Crawford and Clark Gable, which was a "lavishly staged spectacle" with a solid performance by Tone.

Twentieth Century Pictures borrowed Tone to romance Constance Bennett in Moulin Rouge (1934) as she played dual roles in which "she shines as a comedienne" and his performance was called "equally clever in a role that calls for a serious mein" by The New York Times. Back at MGM, he was again co-starring with Crawford in Sadie McKee (1934), then was borrowed by Fox to co-star "commendably" with Madeleine Carroll in John Ford's French Foreign Legion picture, The World Moves On (1934).

After The Girl from Missouri (1934) with Harlow, MGM finally gave Tone top billing in Straight Is the Way (1934), although it was considered a "B" film, one which didn't have a high publicity or production cost. Warner Bros. then borrowed him for Gentlemen Are Born (1934).

At Paramount, Tone co-starred in the Academy Award nominated hit movie, The Lives of a Bengal Lancer (1935) with Gary Cooper. He was top billed in One New York Night (1935) but billed underneath Harlow and William Powell in Reckless (1935). He supported Crawford and Robert Montgomery in No More Ladies (1935) and had another box-office success with Mutiny on the Bounty, for which he was nominated for the Academy Award for Best Actor, along with co-stars Clark Gable and Charles Laughton.

Warner Bros. borrowed him again, this time to play Bette Davis' leading man in Dangerous (1935). Davis has stated this is the picture where she fell in love with Tone, although unreturned, which began difficulties between her and Crawford. After a lead role in Exclusive Story (1935), he was again paired with friend Loretta Young in The Unguarded Hour (1936), and also starred with Grace Moore in Columbia's The King Steps Out (1936), notable for the debut of an eleven-year-old Gwen Verdon.

Tone and Harlow co-starred again in Suzy (1936) with then up and comer Cary Grant, who was billed third. The film was popular with audiences, but reviews were less than kind with The New York Times negatively comparing it to other recent WWI movies calling it "balderdash", but thanked "Mr. Tone for the few honest moments of drama that the film possesses. His young Irishman is about the only convincing and natural character in the piece." He then filmed The Gorgeous Hussy (1936) with Crawford, Robert Taylor and Lionel Barrymore with co-star Beulah Bondi earning an Academy award nomination for the Andrew Jackson period piece. A Crawford and Gable film capitalizing on It Happened One Night by casting the pair in roles as fast talking journalists in Love on the Run (1936), found Tone in a supporting role.

RKO borrowed him to appear opposite Katharine Hepburn in Quality Street (1937), a costume drama that lost $248,000 at the box office. Back at MGM he supported Spencer Tracy and Gladys George in They Gave Him a Gun (1937).

He had the lead in Between Two Women (1937) and co-starred for the final time with Crawford in The Bride Wore Red (1937), then joined Myrna Loy in Man-Proof (1938) and Gladys George in Love Is a Headache (1938).

In Three Comrades (1938) Tone was teamed with Robert Taylor and Margaret Sullavan in a film about disillusioned soldiers returning to Germany after World War I. He made Three Loves Has Nancy (1938) with Janet Gaynor and Robert Montgomery and co-starred with Franciska Gaal in The Girl Downstairs (1938), a Cinderella type story.  He then starred in a "B" picture with Ann Sothern in Fast and Furious (1939) as married crime sleuths, the third movie in a series with different sets of actors in each, that were marketed towards the Thin Man films audiences.

After his contract ended, Tone left MGM in 1939 to act on Broadway in a return to his stage roots, often working with "the Group's" members of its formative years, and playwrights such as Eugene O'Neill. He returned to Broadway for Irwin Shaw's The Gentle People (1939) and an adaptation of Ernest Hemingway's The Fifth Column (1940), which only had a short run.

1940–1949: The Universal, Columbia & Paramount combination 
Tone signed a contract with Universal, starring in his first Western there, Trail of the Vigilantes (1940), where he more than earns his spurs alongside the likes of Broderick Crawford and Andy Devine. He was soon back supporting female stars though, making Nice Girl? (1941) with Deanna Durbin.

Tone also signed a multi-picture deal with Columbia, where he made two films with Joan Bennett, She Knew All the Answers (1941) and The Wife Takes a Flyer (1942).

Back at Universal he was top billed in This Woman Is Mine (1941). Tone went to Paramount to star in Five Graves to Cairo (1942), a World War II espionage story directed by Billy Wilder.

He also returned to MGM to star in Pilot No. 5 (1943) then it was back to Universal for His Butler's Sister (1943) with Durbin.

Tone made two more films at Paramount, True to Life (1943) with Mary Martin and The Hour Before the Dawn (1944) with Veronica Lake. He had one of his best roles in Universal's Phantom Lady (1944) directed by Robert Siodmak, an early film noir picture and a villainous part for Tone. Also impressive was his performance in Dark Waters (1944) with Merle Oberon for Benedict Bogeaus.

He continued his stage career by performing on Broadway in Hope for the Best (1945) with Jane Wyatt; the production ran for a little more than three months.

At Universal Tone did That Night with You (1945) with Susanna Foster and Because of Him (1946) with Durbin.

Tone made Lost Honeymoon (1947) at Eagle-Lion Studios and Honeymoon (1947) with Shirley Temple. While at Columbia he had roles in Her Husband's Affairs (1947) with Lucille Ball, and I Love Trouble (1947), then Every Girl Should Be Married (1948) reteamed with Grant at RKO. He had the lead as an assistant D.A. looking for the murderer of a journalist while being distracted by a beauty played by then wife Jean Wallace in the film noir thriller, Jigsaw (1949).  He then had a supporting part as a murder victim in Without Honor (1949), a noir film co-starring Laraine Day.

1949: Producer 

Tone produced and starred in The Man on the Eiffel Tower (1949), a troubled production suffering from filming delays on location, creative wrangling and the pictures hard to transfer single-strip technicolor film stock. It has benefited from restorations in the 2000s that have coincided with theatrical showings and vastly improved DVD releases. Tone's tour de force role as a manic depressive sociopath included performing many of his own stunts on the Paris landmark.

Burgess Meredith and Charles Laughton star with Tone. Meredith is credited as director, although Tone took over duties when Meredeth was in front of the camera with Laughton sometimes directing himself. The film has some of the best cinematic pictures of the Eiffel Tower according to French director Jean Renior.

1950–1959: Live theater television 
Tone relocated to New York and began appearing in New York City-based live theater television, including The Philco-Goodyear Television Playhouse, Lux Video Theatre, Danger, Suspense and Starlight Theatre. He returned to Hollywood to appear in Here Comes the Groom (1951).

Back on the small screen, Tone was in Lights Out, Tales of Tomorrow, Hollywood Opening Night, The Revlon Mirror Theater, and The Philip Morris Playhouse. But he soon returned to Broadway, appearing in a big hit with Oh, Men! Oh, Women! (1953–54), which ran for 400 performances, a revival of The Time of Your Life (1955) and Eugene O'Neill's A Moon for the Misbegotten with Wendy Hiller and Cyril Cusack in 1957.

During this time he continued to appear on TV adaptations of Broadway plays, in such original productions as Twelve Angry Men, as well as The Elgin Hour, The Ford Television Theatre, and in The Best of Broadway series in a production of The Guardsman with Claudette Colbert. Tone then continued in  Four Star Theatre, Robert Montgomery Presents,  a Playwrights '56 production of The Sound and the Fury, Omnibus, General Electric Theater, The United States Steel Hour, The Kaiser Aluminum Hour, The Alcoa Hour, Climax!, Armchair Theatre, Pursuit, Westinghouse Desilu Playhouse, Alfred Hitchcock Presents, Goodyear Theatre, Playhouse 90, and The DuPont Show of the Month.

He did a TV adaptation of The Little Foxes (1956) with Greer Garson and played Frank James in Bitter Heritage (1958). In 1957 Tone co-produced, co-directed, and starred in an adaptation of Chekhov's Uncle Vanya, which was filmed concurrently with an off-Broadway revival. His performance as the Russian country doctor with "ennui" was praised and the preserving of the stage production to film only varied by the addition of then wife Dolores Dorn.

1960–1968: Final films and television 
In the early 1960s Tone was in episodes of Bonanza and The Twilight Zone ("The Silence") and appeared on Broadway in an adaptation of Mandingo (1961). He then played the spent, dying president in the screen adaptation of the Pulitzer Prize-winning novel Advise & Consent (1962), an Otto Preminger film that the director had unsuccessfully lobbied Martin Luther King to portray a senator in, while two U.S. senators played extras on Capitol Hill locations previously used for Mr. Smith Goes to Washington.

On stage in 1963 he acted in a revival of O'Neill's Strange Interlude, with Ben Gazzarra and Jane Fonda, and Bicycle Ride to Nevada. The next year he appeared in Lewis John Carlino's Double Talk.

He was cast in TV shows such as The Eleventh Hour, Dupont Show of the Week, The Reporter, Festival, The Alfred Hitchcock Hour, and The Virginian. He appeared in what is possibly the first TV movie, See How They Run (1964).

In Europe, Tone made La bonne soupe (1965). He co-starred in the Ben Casey medical series from 1965 to 1966 as Casey's supervisor, Dr. Daniel Niles Freeland.

He had roles in Otto Preminger's film In Harm's Way (1965) in which he portrayed Admiral Husband E. Kimmel and Arthur Penn's Mickey One (1965), and an episode of Run for Your Life. He appeared off-Broadway in Beyond Desire (1967) and his last roles were in Shadow Over Elveron (1968) and Nobody Runs Forever (1968), a British film originally titled The High Commissioner.

Personal life 

In 1935 Tone married actress Joan Crawford; the couple were divorced in 1939. They made seven films together – Today We Live (1933), Dancing Lady (1933), Sadie McKee (1934), No More Ladies (1935), The Gorgeous Hussy (1936), Love on the Run (1936), and The Bride Wore Red (1937). Their union produced no children; despite considerable effort, Crawford's pregnancies all ended in miscarriage.

Tone took their divorce hard, and his recollections of her were cynical — "She's like that old joke about Philadelphia: first prize, four years with Joan; second prize, eight". Many years later, however, when Tone was dying of lung cancer, Joan often cared for him, paying for medical treatments and at one point, Tone suggested they remarry, but she declined the offer.

In 1941 Tone married fashion model-turned-actress Jean Wallace, who appeared with Tone in both Jigsaw and The Man on the Eiffel Tower. The couple had two sons and were divorced in 1948. She later married actor Cornel Wilde.

In 1951 Tone's relationship with actress Barbara Payton made headlines when he was rendered unconscious for 18 hours and sustained numerous facial injuries following a fistfight with actor Tom Neal, a rival for Payton's attention. Plastic surgery nearly fully restored his broken nose and cheek. Tone subsequently married Payton, but divorced her in 1952, after obtaining photographic evidence she had continued her relationship with Neal. Payton and Neal capitalized on the scandal touring with a production of The Postman Always Rings Twice.

In 1956 Tone married Dolores Dorn, with whom he appeared in a film version of Uncle Vanya (1957) which Tone directed and produced. The couple divorced in 1959.

Death 
Tone, a chain smoker, died of lung cancer in New York City on September 18, 1968. He was cremated and his ashes kept on a shelf in his son's library, surrounded by the works of Shakespeare, until July 24, 2022, when they were interred in the Point Comfort Cemetery of Quebec, Canada.

On February 8, 1960, Franchot Tone received a star on the Hollywood Walk of Fame for his contribution to the motion picture industry, located at 6558 Hollywood Blvd, on the south side of the 6500 block.

Filmography

Partial TV credits

Theater appearances

Radio appearances

References

External links 

 
 
 
Pronunciation of Franchot Tone
Al Hirschfeld illustration of Franchot Tone

American male film actors
Film producers from New York (state)
American male stage actors
American male television actors
20th-century American male actors
Cornell University alumni
The Hill School alumni
Deaths from lung cancer in New York (state)
Male actors from New York City
People from Niagara Falls, New York
1905 births
1968 deaths
American people of Irish descent
American people of French-Canadian descent
American people of Basque descent
American people of English descent
Metro-Goldwyn-Mayer contract players
20th-century American businesspeople
Film directors from New York (state)